Shankhonad (Wail of the Conch) is a 2004 Bangladeshi drama film directed by Abu Sayeed. It stars Zahid Hasan, KS Firoz, Nazma Anwar, and Fazlur Rahman Babu.

Plot
Osman returns to his ancestral village on a stormy night, the same village he had fled in the dark of the night 27 years ago. He finds shelter in the home of Mannaf Khan, a village elder. Osman seeks to rediscover his childhood and goes about reliving the past through childhood memories. He meets Kunjo Buri who had nursed him as an infant. He also meets his boyhood friend Fazlu. Osman is not after worldly gains, he wants to spend the rest of his life in the village, and relive the nostalgia of bygone days. That, however, is not to be. He comes face to face with a reality of a markedly different kind, when Mannaf Khan realizes he is the son of the pair his father murdered.

"After more than 27 years of absence Chand returns to his birthplace in a stormy night. When he was still a child his parents were killed and the murderer seized his fields. Without exposing his real identity he meets the people that characterized his childhood: the sorceress Kunjuburi, his friend Fazlu and the son of his parent's murderer, Mannaf Khan. The latter welcomes him at first cordially, but when he comes to know his real identity he tries to get rid of him."

Cast
 Zahid Hasan as Osman
 KS Firoz as Mannaf Khan
 Nazma Anwar as Kujo Buri
 Fazlur Rahman Babu as Fazlu
 Krishnendu
 Rebeka Dipa 
 Insan Ali
 Mehnaz Parveen Bani

Festival participations 
 Official selection, Fribourg International Film Festival
 Official selection, Asian African & Latin American Film Festival
 Official selection, Commonwealth Film Festival
 Official selection, Dubai International Film Festival
 Official selection, International Film Festival, India

Reception
Writing in Variety, Deborah Young praised Mahfuzur Rahman Khan's camerawork, but said the convoluted narrative structure "is urgently in need of a substantial re-edit to make the storytelling more logical".

Award
 National Film Award in three categories, 2004
 Best Film, Meril-Prothom Alo 2004

References

Bengali-language Bangladeshi films
2004 films
Films scored by S I Tutul
Films directed by Abu Sayeed (film director)
2000s Bengali-language films